Eduardo Nantes Bolsonaro (born 10 July 1984) is a Brazilian politician, lawyer and federal police officer. He is the third child of Jair Bolsonaro, the 38th president of Brazil.

Career
He has been a member of the Chamber of Deputies since 2015, and is affiliated to the Social Liberal Party (PSL). In 2018, he was re-elected to a second term as Federal Deputy, being the most voted lawmaker in Brazil's history after he received 1.8 million votes.

In February 2019, it was reported that Bolsonaro was joining The Movement. The European-based organisation supports right-wing populism and was founded by former White House Chief Strategist Steve Bannon. He is the representative for the group in South America.

In the Chamber of Deputies, Bolsonaro chairs the International Affairs and National Defense Committee.

Having previously lived in Maine and Colorado, Bolsonaro says he learned English while "flipping burgers", which led to his father inviting him to become ambassador to the United States. In October 2019, after being confirmed as leader of the PSL in the Chamber of Deputies, Bolsonaro withdrew from his nomination and President Bolsonaro nominated the Chargé d'Affaires Nesttor Forster.

On 31 October 2019, Bolsonaro threatened to introduce a "new AI-5" in response to accused left-wing radicalization. AI-5 or Institutional Act Number Five was the fifth of seventeen major decrees issued by the military dictatorship of Brazil that gave them the power to override the government and constitution.

Bolsonaro signed the Madrid Charter, a document drafted by the conservative Spanish political party Vox that describes left-wing groups as enemies of Ibero-America involved in a "criminal project" that are "under the umbrella of the Cuban regime". He signed the document along with Rafael López Aliaga of Peru, Javier Milei of Argentina, José Antonio Kast of Chile and Giorgia Meloni of Italy. Following Meloni's success in the 2022 Italian general election, Bolsonaro celebrated her victory stating "Italy’s new prime minister is God, fatherland and family".

Personal life
His brothers are Flávio Bolsonaro, a member of the Legislative Assembly of Rio de Janeiro from 2003 to 2019 and currently member of the Federal Senate, and Carlos Bolsonaro, a member of the Rio de Janeiro City Council since 2001. He married the psychologist Heloísa Wolf on 25 May 2019, in Santa Tereza, Rio de Janeiro. The wedding was an intimate ceremony for 150 guests, including the father of the groom President of the Federative Republic of Brazil Jair Bolsonaro, and First Lady Michelle Bolsonaro, who is the stepmother of the groom. She was one of the bridesmaids at the wedding. On 10 October 2020 at 5:25 am, Eduardo's first child with Heloísa, a girl the couple named Geórgia Wolf Bolsonaro, was born.

Eduardo is a big fan of the band Forfun.

Electoral results

Awards 

In 2015, Eduardo Bolsonaro ranked first in the category "Combating Corruption and Organized Crime" of the Focus Awards 2015. Bolsonaro had 16,769 votes, more than 10 thousand ahead of the second place.

In 2017, Eduardo Bolsonaro ranked first in the category of "Best Deputy" of the Focus Awards 2017. He had 55,256 votes, almost three times ahead of the second place.

Critics

New Ai-5 
In late October 2019, Eduardo said a "new AI-5" was a possibility in case of "left-wing radicalization" in Brazil. The speech took place in an interview with journalist Leda Nagle's YouTube channel after a question about the protests in Chile. Institutional Act No. 5 (AI-5) was edited in 1968, during the harshest period of the Brazilian military dictatorship and resulted in the dissolution of the National Congress and state legislative assemblies, in addition to suspending constitutional guarantees, allowing the rescission of political rights in a summary form and the end of habeas corpus. The period that followed AI-5 was marked by intensification of censorship and political repression, with torture and assassination of opponents of the regime.

Eduardo's statement generated widespread negative reaction from left, center and right parties, in addition to the judiciary. The opposition said it will denounce Eduardo to the Parliamentary Ethics and Decoration Council. Mayor Rodrigo Maia said in an official statement that the declaration on AI-5 was "repugnant" and that the "repeated apology for the instruments of the dictatorship is punishable by the tools that hold the Brazilian democratic institutions"

The Constitution guarantees Eduardo Bolsonaro not to be punished "for any of his opinions, words or votes", the so-called "parliamentary immunity" provided for in Article 53 of the Constitution. However, the Constitution itself also states in Article 55 that a parliamentarian may lose his or her mandate for "breach of decorum" if there is "abuse of the prerogatives (rights)" guaranteed to congressmen. Based on this, the opposition announced that it will ask for Eduardo's impeachment in the Council of Ethics and Parliamentary Decor.

After the strong negative reaction and being reprimanded by President Jair Bolsonaro, the deputy said he had been misinterpreted in the Brasil Urgente program, of Band, and apologized for the statement.

See also 

 Carlos Bolsonaro
 Flávio Bolsonaro
 Yair Netanyahu - son of Israeli prime minister Benjamin Netanyahu
 Donald Trump Jr. - son of 45th US President Donald J. Trump

References

External links

 
 Profile in the Chamber of Deputies

|-

|-

1984 births
Living people
People from Rio de Janeiro (city)
Anti-Chinese sentiment
Brazilian people of Italian descent
Brazilian people of Venetian descent
Brazilian people of Calabrian descent
Brazilian people of German descent
Conservatism in Brazil
Far-right politics in Brazil
Social Liberal Party (Brazil) politicians
Social Christian Party (Brazil) politicians
Liberal Party (Brazil, 2006) politicians
Eduardo
Brazilian police officers
Federal University of Rio de Janeiro alumni
Children of presidents of Brazil
Brazilian anti-communists
Critics of Islamism
Signers of the Madrid Charter